African Petroleum Producers Organization (APPO) (Organisation Africaine des Producteurs Pétroliers in French, Organização dos Produtores Africanos de Petróleo in Portuguese and المنظمة الأفريقية لمنتجي البترول in Arabic) is an organization of African countries producing petroleum. It was created on January 27, 1987, in Lagos, Nigeria, to serve as a platform for cooperation and harmonization of efforts, collaboration, sharing of knowledge and skills among African oil producing countries. The headquarters of the organization is in Brazzaville in the Congo. The Organization changed its name from African Petroleum Producers Association to African Petroleum Producers Organization in 2017.

The founding of APPO was spearheaded by Nigeria as an effort to mitigate the nation's dependency on Western technology and Western markets for oil export revenues. The objective of APPO is to promote cooperation in petrochemical research and technology.

Mission and vision

APPO's mission is to promote cooperation in the field of hydrocarbons of its Member Countries and other global institutions to foster fruitful collaboration and partnerships while utilizing petroleum as a catalyst for energy security, sustainable development and economic diversification in Africa. 

APPO aspires to be the World's reference and lead institution on Africa's hydro-carbon matters.

Membership 

The following African states are members of the African Petroleum Producers Organization:

Observer 

The following non-African states are observer members of the African Petroleum Producers Organization:

Strategic objectives

 Member Countries' Cooperation: Promote cooperation among Member Countries and other global institutions in various sectors of the hydrocarbon industry: commercial, scientific, technical, technological, legal, fiscal as well as in the field of human resources;
 African Energy Development: Promote the development of regional markets and coordinated energy integration strategies in the continent;
 High Level Studies & Partnerships: Develop research programmes about the major challenges in the petroleum sector of African countries,
 Socioeconomic Development: Promote economic development and market diversification activities by enhancing hydrocarbon sector local procurement, employment and gender diversification.
 Environmental Protection: Promote environmental protection and management policies.
 International Best Practices: Promote the use of international best practices.
 Organizational Visibility: Increase the visibility and level of awareness of APPO as a leader and reference institution on petroleum within and beyond Africa.

Leadership and decision-making

The leadership of APPO consists of:
 Council of Ministers
 Executive Board
 Secretary General 
 Managing Directors of National Oil Companies

Footnotes

External links
 APPO official website
 APPA - official website

International organizations based in Africa
International energy organizations
Petroleum production
Intergovernmental organizations
Organisations based in the Republic of the Congo